The Group of Two (G-2 or G2) was a proposed informal special relationship between the People's Republic of China and the United States of America. Originally initiated in 2005 by C. Fred Bergsten as primarily an economic relationship, it began to gain wider currency and scope from foreign policy experts as a term recognizing the centrality of the Sino-American relations near the beginning of the Obama Administration. Prominent advocates include former National Security Advisor Zbigniew Brzezinski, historian Niall Ferguson, former World Bank President Robert Zoellick and former chief economist Justin Yifu Lin.

As two of the most influential and powerful countries in the world, there have been increasingly strong suggestions within American political circles of creating a G-2 relationship where the United States and China would work out solutions to global problems together, and to prevent another cold war.

History 
The concept of a G-2 was first raised by noted economist C. Fred Bergsten in 2005. In 2009, Bergsten made the following arguments for such a relationship:

Zbigniew Brzezinski had been a vocal advocate for the concept. He publicly advanced the notion in Beijing in January 2009 as the two countries celebrated the 30th anniversary of establishing formal diplomatic ties. He views the informal G-2 as helpful in finding solutions to the global financial crisis, climate change (see Politics of global warming), North Korea's nuclear program, Iran's nuclear program, the Indo-Pakistani wars and conflicts, the Israeli–Palestinian conflict, United Nations peacekeeping, nuclear proliferation, and nuclear disarmament. He called the principle of "harmony" a "mission worthy of the two countries with the most extraordinary potential for shaping our collective future".

Historian Niall Ferguson has also advocated the G-2 concept. He coined the term Chimerica to describe the symbiotic nature of the U.S.-China economic relationship.

Robert Zoellick, former president of the World Bank, and Justin Yifu Lin, the Bank's former chief economist and senior vice president, have stated that the G-2 is crucial for economic recovery and that the U.S. and China must work together. They state that "without a strong G-2, the G-20 will disappoint".

While widely discussed, the concept of a G-2 has not been fully defined. According to Brzezinski, G-2 described the current realities, while for former British Foreign Secretary David Miliband, a G-2 could emerge in the foreseeable future. Miliband proposes EU integration as a means to create a potential G-3 that consists of the United States, China and the European Union.

Former President Barack Obama and former United States Secretary of State Hillary Clinton have been very supportive of good relations between the two countries and more cooperation on more issues more often. Former Secretary of State Henry Kissinger has stated that U.S.–China relationship should be "taken to a new level". Some experts have disagreed with the effectiveness of a G-2. However, Clinton has said that there is no G-2.

The G-2 concept has been often evoked in international media during major bilateral meetings such as the Strategic and Economic Dialogue and state visits as well as during global summits like the G-20 meetings and the Copenhagen Summit.

See also 
 Chimerica
 China–United States relations
 United States–China security cooperation
 East Asia island arcs
 EU three
 G-7
 G-8
 G-20
 Most favoured nation
 State capitalism
 U.S.–China Strategic and Economic Dialogue

References 

China–United States relations
Proposed international organizations
2005 neologisms